Agboola Shadare is a Nigerian songwriter, composer and producer. He started as a church musician, then moved into club and studio production in Nigeria. He produced for popular Nigerian artistes such as Gbenga Owoeye-Wise and Mike Aremu, and released two solo albums, Dream Dawn and Glory. Shadare then moved to the US, playing Christian smooth jazz. Agboola's music is now played around the world.

He has performed alongside Bob James, Ron Kenoly, Yolanda Adams and other top artistes and several times on TBN.

Agboola held concerts across Europe, being due to return to the United States in March 2009, where he was to release two albums and a play at a concert at the New Jersey Performing Arts Center in Newark.

Early life 

Agboola was born in Kano City in Africa on 9 May 1970. Originally from Ilesa, in Southern Nigeria.

At the age of twelve Shadares became a drummer in the church. By age 19 he had learnt more instruments, particularly the guitar, which became his signature instrument, playing with his own style.

Between 1993 and 1994, Agboola appeared in several concerts with the group Treasure Band. He later concentrated on a Christian approach; between 1994 and 2002 he played with House On The Rock Musical Ministries, led by Pastor Paul Adefarasin.

Agboola became the first Nigerian artist to produce a contemporary jazz album Dream Dawn.

In 2000, he was nominated for the  Nigerian Musical Award, where he won the BEST CONTEMPORARY JAZZ ALBUM OF THE YEAR AWARD. Shortly after, he started his own band, called the "Motivation Band."

Discography 

Dream Dawn
 Jesus Loves Me
 Tire
 Am So Grateful
 Abube
 Be Magnified
 Praise Him
 Talojulo
 Higher Ground
 Modupe
 Holy Spirit
 Dream Dawn
 Worship Him
 Ose Baba
14 Holy Ground

External links 
 Official Site
 My Space
 CD Baby
 Facebook

References 
 Gospel.de
 Smooth Jazz
 Event and Show
 The Sun News Online
 Tradebit.com
 Stadtmonster.de
 Naijarules.com

Nigerian songwriters
Nigerian record producers
Nigerian composers
Nigerian guitarists
Nigerian emigrants to the United States
Living people
Yoruba musicians
Musicians from Kano State
1970 births
English-language singers from Nigeria
Yoruba-language singers
21st-century Nigerian singers
21st-century guitarists